Christian Sánchez may refer to:
Christian Sánchez (Mexican footballer) (born 1989), Mexican football defender
Christian Sánchez (Salvadoran footballer) (born 1983), Salvadoran football midfielder for Once Deportivo
Christian Nava Sánchez (born 1982), Mexican politician

See also
 Cristián Sánchez (disambiguation)